Fița Lovin (née Rafira on 14 January 1951) is a retired middle-distance runner from Romania. She competed at the 1980 and 1984 Olympics and won the bronze medal in 800 metres in 1984. She also won the European 1500 m indoor title in 1984 and a silver medal at the 1982 IAAF World Cross Country Championships, placing fourth in 1985.

References

Romanian female middle-distance runners
1951 births
Living people
Olympic athletes of Romania
Athletes (track and field) at the 1980 Summer Olympics
Athletes (track and field) at the 1984 Summer Olympics
Medalists at the 1984 Summer Olympics
Olympic bronze medalists for Romania
Olympic bronze medalists in athletics (track and field)
Universiade medalists in athletics (track and field)
Universiade bronze medalists for Romania
World Athletics Indoor Championships medalists